Simonus is a genus of spiders in the family Miturgidae. It was first described in 1881 by Ritsema. , it contains only one species, Simonus lineatus, from Western Australia.

References

Miturgidae
Monotypic Araneomorphae genera
Spiders of Australia